Curuppumullage Jinarajadasa (16 December 1875, British Ceylon – 18 June 1953, United States) was a Sri Lankan author, occultist, freemason and theosophist. The fourth president of the Theosophical Society, Jinarajadasa was one of the world's foremost Theosophical authors, having published more than 50 books and more than 1600 articles in periodicals during his life. His interests and writings included religion, philosophy, literature, art, science and occult chemistry. He was also a rare linguist, who had the ability to work in many European languages.

Early life
Jinarajadasa was born on 16 December 1875 in Sri Lanka to a family of Sinhalese parents. He was one of the first students of Ananda College, Colombo. In 1889, when Charles Webster Leadbeater, the first principal of Ananda College was asked by A.P. Sinnett to come back to England to tutor his son, Leadbeater agreed and also brought one of his pupils, Jinarajadasa, to England with him. Thanks to Leadbeater, Jinarajadasa went to St John's College, Cambridge where he studied oriental languages and four years later took his Degree in the Oriental Languages Tripos.

Career
He then came back to Ceylon and became the vice principal of Ananda College in Colombo. Jinarajadasa returned to Europe, to study at the University of Pavia, Italy. He soon became proficient in Italian, French, Spanish and Portuguese. Around 1904 he visited Chicago, where he met and influenced Weller van Hook, the well-known surgeon and author, who then became a theosophist. During his lifetime, Jinarajadasa traveled to many countries despite all the war difficulties of that era for his devoted service to Theosophy.

He was one among four Convention Lecturers, including G.S. Arundale, B.P. Wadia, and T. Sadasivier,  who spoke in Calcutta at the Forty-Second Anniversary of the Theosophical Society in  December, 1917. In his lecture, The Problem of Religion And Philosophy, he stressed the need to serve others, saying “We have a perennial need of God, of understanding the mystery of the I . . . When the heart and brain are ready, the hand will be guided by a Divine Architect to build according to His Plan. Each of you must help in this day to come. Not the smallest child but can help in some tiny action, not the poorest now who cannot heap up wealth of hope for that future. For within us is the Light of the World and the Power of the World –– if only we knew how to find.   But the doors of all the treasure-houses will open if we know the right mantra to repeat, the open sesame  of this newer day.  It is the new word of power:  ‘Brother, thou art I.

”He also traveled to South America, where he lectured in Spanish and Portuguese and founded branches of the Theosophical Society (TS). He was the Vice-President of the Theosophical Society from 1921 to 1928. After the death of Dr George Arundale in 1945, Jinarajadasa became president of the Theosophical Society Adyar. In 1949 he founded the School of Wisdom in Adyar, which attracted students from many countries. He was also a Freemason, joining Le Droit Humain also known as Co-Masonry. Curuppumullage Jinarajadasa was the president of Theosophical Society until his death on 18 June 1953 in the United States.

Personal life
On 11 November 1916 (in Kensington, West London), Jinarajadasa married British feminist, Dorothy May Graham ( May Dorothea Graham; 19 March 1881, Scotland - 13 January 1963), who founded the Women's Indian Association (WIA) in Adyar with Annie Besant in 1917. She accompanied him in his travels around the world for some years. At one stage of his life, he resided in Brazil.

By 1953, he declined renomination as president of the Theosophical Society due to poor health and installed Nilakanta Sri Ram as his successor. He visited America where he died on 18 June 1953 at the national headquarters of the Theosophical Society, called “Olcott”. His body was cremated; half of his ashes were sent to Adyar for deposit in the Garden of Remembrance there. The rest were kept at Olcott until the late 1990s, when they were deposited in an American Garden of Remembrance created to receive them.

Works (selection)
Jinarajadasa wrote many works on Theosophy, Theology, philosophy, literature, art and science. He also participated in Annie Besant's and Charles Leadbeater's researches on Occult Chemistry. 

In 1913, Jinarajadasa was awarded the Subba Row Medal for his contribution to Theosophical literature.

Jinarajadasa published more than 1,600 articles in periodicals such as The Adyar Bulletin, The American Theosophist, The Australian ES Bulletin, The Herald of the Star, The Messenger, Sishya (The Student), The Theosophic Messenger, The Theosophist, and World Theosophy. Jinarajadasa was also editor of The Theosophist for three periods.

The K.H. Letters to C.W. Leadbeater 
It is a book compiled by Jinarajadasa; it was first published in 1941. Jinarajadasa wrote that C.W. Leadbeater joined the Theosophical Society in November 1883, and after his contact with Helena Blavatsky in London he decided to become a chela (disciple) of one of the Mahatmas.

First Letter from the Master

At the beginning of the book Jinarajadasa proclaimed that an incident with receiving certain letters from the Master K.H. was very great Leadbeater's success. Leadbeater reminisced that he wrote a letter to the Master K.H. In that letter it was said that "his one great wish has been to become chela but it would be almost impossible without going out to India." Then Leadbeater entrusted the letter to a medium William Eglinton and his "control" Ernest. He talked later:
"I waited for some months, but no reply came, and whenever I went to Eglinton's séances and happened to encounter Ernest I always asked him when I might expect my answer. He invariably said that my letter had been duly delivered, but that nothing had yet been said about an answer, and that he could do no more."
Leadbeater received a reply on the morning of October 31, 1884. The letter of the Master K.H. was to be posted in England, on envelope it was typed "Kensington" (it is a postal district in the west of London) and "OC-30-84" (it is the date).

Master Kuthumi replied in this letter:
"Last spring — March 3rd — you wrote a letter to me and entrusted it to 'Ernest'. Tho' the paper itself never reached me — nor was it ever likely to considering the nature of the messenger — its contents have. I did not answer it at that time, but sent you a message through Upasika.

In that message of yours it was said that, since reading Esot. Bud: and Isis your 'one great wish has been to place yourself under me as a chela, that you may learn more of the truth.' 'I understand from Mr. S.' you went on 'that it would be almost impossible to become a chela without going out to India'. You hoped to be able to do that in a few years, tho' for the present ties of gratitude bind you to remain in this country. Etc.

I now answer the above and your other questions.

(1) It is not necessary that one should be in India during the seven years of probation. A chela can pass them anywhere.

(2) To accept any man as a chela does not depend on my personal will. It can only be the result of one's personal merit and exertions in that direction. Force any one of the 'Masters' you may happen to choose; do good works in his name and for the love of mankind; be pure and resolute in the path of righteousness (as laid out in our rules); be honest and unselfish; forget your Self but to remember the good of other people — and you will have forced that 'Master' to accept you.

So much for candidates during the periods of the undisturbed progress of your Society. There is something more to be done, however, when theosophy, the Cause of Truth, is, as at the present moment on its stand for life or death before the tribunal of public opinion — that most flippantly cruel, prejudiced and unjust of all tribunals. There is also the collective karma of the caste you belong to — to be considered. It is undeniable that the cause you have at heart is now suffering owing to the dark intrigues, the base conspiracy of the Christian clergy and missionaries against the Society. They will stop before nothing to ruin the reputation of the Founders. Are you willing to atone for their sins? Then go to Adyar for a few months. 'The ties or gratitude' will not be severed, nor even become weakened for an absence of a few months if the step be explained plausibly to your relative. He who would shorten the years of probation has to make sacrifices for theosophy.

Pushed by malevolent hands to the very edge of a precipice, the Society needs every man and woman strong in the cause of truth. It is by doing noble actions and not by only determining that they shall be done that the fruits of the meritorious actions are reaped. Like the 'true man' of Carlyle who is not to be seduced by ease — 'difficulty, abnegation, martyrdom, death are the allurements that act' during the hours of trial on the heart of a true chela.

You ask me — 'what rules I must observe during this time of probation, and how soon I might venture to hope that it could begin'. I answer: you have the making of your own future, in your own hands as shown above, and every day you may be weaving its woof. If I were to demand that you should do one thing or the other, instead of simply advising, I would be responsible for every effect that might flow from the step and you acquire but a secondary merit. Think, and you will see that this is true. So cast the lot yourself into the lap of Justice, never fearing but that its response will be absolutely true.

Chelaship is an educational as well as probationary stage and the chela alone can determine whether it shall end in adeptship or failure. Chelas from a mistaken idea of our system too often watch and wait for orders, wasting precious time which should be taken up with personal effort. Our cause needs missionaries, devotees, agents, even martyrs perhaps. But it cannot demand of any man to make himself either. So now choose and grasp your own destiny, and may our Lord's the Tathâgata's memory aid you to decide for the best.

−K.H."
In the book Jinarajadasa gave about thirty detailed commentaries to the statements of the first Master's letter.

Second letter from the Master

Jinarajadasa stated that Leadbeater wrote "his second letter to the Master K.H., in reply to the Master's communication, and took it with him to London. Here we have the story of the next events in this striking drama from Mr. Leadbeater himself."
Leadbeater was reminiscing that he wished to say in answer to this that "his circumstances were such that it would be impossible for him to come to Adyar for three months, and then return to the work in which he was then engaged; but that he was perfectly ready to throw up that work altogether and to devote his life absolutely to Master's service". Ernest having so conspicuously failed him, he knew of no way to get this message to the Master but to take it to Blavatsky, and as she was to leave England on the following day for India, Leadbeater rushed up to London to see her.

Leadbeater talked that "it was with difficulty that he induced her to read the letter, as she said very decidedly that such communications were intended only for the recipient". He was obliged to insist, however, and at last she read it and asked him what he wished to say in reply. He answered to the above effect, and asked her how this information could be conveyed to the Master. She replied that he knew it already, referring of course to the exceedingly close relation in which she stood with him, so that whatever was within her consciousness was also within his when he wished it.

Leadbeater talked:
"She then told me to wait by her, and not to leave her on any account. I waited patiently all through the afternoon and evening, and even went with her quite late at night to Mrs. Oakley's house, where a number of friends were gathered to say farewell Madame Blavatsky sat in an easy chair by the fireside, talking brilliantly to those who were present, and rolling one of her eternal cigarettes, when suddenly her right hand was jerked out towards the fire in a very peculiar fashion, and lay palm upwards. She looked down at it in surprise, as I did myself, for I was standing close to her, leaning with an elbow on the mantelpiece; and several of us saw quite clearly a sort of whitish mist form in the palm of her hand and then condense into a piece of folded paper, which she at once handed to me, saying, 'There is your answer'."
Every one in the room crowded round, of course, but H.P.B. sent Leadbeater away outside to read it, saying that he must not let anyone see its contents. The letter read:

"Since your intuition led you in the right direction and made you understand that it was my desire you should go to Adyar immediately, I may say more. The sooner you go the better. Do not lose one day more than you can help. Sail on the 5th if possible. Join Upasika at Alexandria. Let no one know that you are going, and may the blessing of our Lord and my poor blessing shield you from every evil in your new life. Greeting to you, my new chela.

−K.H."

Two brief messages from the Master
The author wrote that during the trip from Ismailia to Cairo, Blavatsky received a precipitated message from the Master K.H., in which there was some words for Leadbeater:
"Tell Leadbeater that I am satisfied with his zeal and devotion."
In 1886 at Ceylon Leadbeater became first principal of the Buddhist High School (today Ananda College). In this time at Colombo he received from Blavatsky a letter containing Master's addendum which was precipitated during passing through the post. The Master K.H. said in the addendum that he is "pleased with" Leadbeater.

Criticism

His books on Theosophy were negatively reviewed by scientists. Science writer Hugh S. R. Elliot mocked Jinarajadasa's belief that every genus and species has a "group soul". Elliot noted that "for wherever a difficulty occurs, the author invents a spook to account for any process he cannot understand."

Notes

References

Sources

External links
 Biography
 The K.H. Letters to C.W. Leadbeater

1875 births
1953 deaths
Sri Lankan Theosophists
Alumni of Ananda College
American people of Sri Lankan descent
Alumni of St John's College, Cambridge
Sinhalese academics